The Samaritan script is used by the Samaritans for religious writings, including the Samaritan Pentateuch, writings in Samaritan Hebrew, and for commentaries and translations in Samaritan Aramaic and occasionally Arabic.

Samaritan is a direct descendant of the Paleo-Hebrew alphabet, which was a variety of the Phoenician alphabet. Paleo-Hebrew is the alphabet in which large parts of the Hebrew Bible were originally penned according to the consensus of most scholars, who also believe that these scripts are descendants of the Proto-Sinaitic script. Paleo-Hebrew script was used by the ancient Israelites, both Jews and Samaritans.

The better-known "square script" Hebrew alphabet which has been traditionally used by Jews since the Babylonian exile is a stylized version of the Aramaic alphabet called Ashurit (כתב אשורי), though religious literalist interpretations of  assume that the text asserts that it was received on Sinai from the Finger of God and that it has been in continuous and unchanged use since then.

Historically, the Aramaic alphabet became distinct from Phoenician/Paleo-Hebrew in the 8th century. After the fall of the Persian Empire, Judaism used both scripts before settling on the Aramaic form, henceforth de facto becoming the “Hebrew alphabet” since it was repurposed to write Hebrew. For a limited time thereafter, the use of paleo-Hebrew (proto-Samaritan) among Jews was retained only to write the Tetragrammaton, but soon that custom was also abandoned.

A cursive style of the alphabet also exists.

The Samaritan alphabet first became known to the Western world with the publication of a manuscript of the Samaritan Pentateuch in 1631 by Jean Morin. In 1616 the traveler Pietro della Valle had purchased a copy of the text in Damascus, and this manuscript, now known as Codex B, was deposited in a Parisian library.

Development
The table below shows the development of the Samaritan script. On the left are the corresponding Hebrew letters for comparison. Column I is the Paleo-Hebrew alphabet. Column X shows the modern form of the letters.

Letters

Consonants
    ā'lāf
    bīt
    gā'mān
    dā'lāt
    īy
    bā̊
    zēn
    īt
    ṭīt
    yūt
    kā̊f
    lā'bāt
    mīm
    nūn
    sin'gā̊t
    īn
    fī
    ṣā̊'dīy
    qūf
    rīš
    šān
    tā̊f

Vowels
  
    ā'lāf
     occlusion
    dagesh
    epenthetic yūt
    epenthetic yût
    ē
    e/ə
    ā̊ː
    ā̊
    å
    āː
    ā
    a
    ă
    ă
    ū
    u
    î
    ī
    i
    ō
    sukun

Punctuation

Unicode

Samaritan script was added to the Unicode Standard in October 2009 with the release of version 5.2.

The Unicode block for Samaritan is U+0800–U+083F:

See also
 Samaritan vocalization
 Samaritan source sign

References

Bibliography

External links
A Samaritan Bible, at the British library
Omniglot.com - Samaritan alphabet
Link to free Samaritan font (consonants only as of 2010)

Abjad writing systems
Canaanite writing systems
Hebrew language
Samaritan culture and history
Semitic writing systems
Right-to-left writing systems